Nikolayevka is a rural locality (a selo) and the administrative centre of Nikolayevsky Selsoviet, Beloretsky District, Bashkortostan, Russia. The population was 113 as of 2010. There are 3 streets.

Geography 
Nikolayevka is located 55 km northeast of Beloretsk (the district's administrative centre) by road. Makhmutovo is the nearest rural locality.

References 

Rural localities in Beloretsky District